The Sværholt Peninsula is a peninsula in Finnmark county, Norway.  The peninsula lies between the Porsangerfjorden and Laksefjorden in the municipalities of Nordkapp, Lebesby, and Porsanger.  The  peninsula has some settlements, mostly on the inner part of the peninsula.  The villages of Veidnes and Brenna are two of the larger settlements on the Sværholt Peninsula.  The lake Kjæsvannet lies in the central part of the peninsula. The Sværholtklubben Nature Reserve lies at the northern tip of the peninsula.

References

Nordkapp
Lebesby
Porsanger
Peninsulas of Troms og Finnmark